The JŽ Series 662, manufactured by Đuro Đaković, and nicknamed Nada (Serbo-Croatian for Hope; also a female first name) was the first diesel-electric locomotive produced in SFR Yugoslavia.

The locomotive was used for traffic in Bosnia and Herzegovina and Serbia.

References 

 Valter, Z. Dizel-električna lokomotiva, Zagreb (1984); ID: 02-892/1-1984

Co′Co′ locomotives
Diesel-electric locomotives of Bosnia and Herzegovina
Diesel-electric locomotives of Serbia
Diesel-electric locomotives of Yugoslavia
Đuro Đaković (company)